Zilora is a genus of false darkling beetles in the family Melandryidae. There are about seven described species in Zilora.

Species
These seven species belong to the genus Zilora:
 Zilora canadensis Hausen, 1891 g
 Zilora elongata J.Sahlberg, 1881 g
 Zilora ferruginea (Paykull, 1798) g
 Zilora hispida Leconte, 1866 g b
 Zilora nuda Provancher, 1877 g
 Zilora obscura (Fabricius, 1807) g
 Zilora occidentalis Mank, 1938 g
Data sources: i = ITIS, c = Catalogue of Life, g = GBIF, b = Bugguide.net

References

Further reading

External links

 

Melandryidae